Trzebinia  is a village in the administrative district of Gmina Świnna, in Żywiec County, Silesian Voivodeship, in southern Poland.

The village has a population of 1,721.

References

Trzebinia